Para ice hockey at the Winter Paralympics has been held since the 1994 Winter Paralympics, when it was known as ice sledge hockey (the sport was renamed by the International Paralympic Committee in 2016).

The tournament was to change from a men's to a mixed tournament for the 2010 Paralympic Games in Vancouver, allowing the teams to include female players, but no women participated in the 2010 tournament.

Medalists
Open

Tournaments

Medal table
This is the all time medal count won in Para ice hockey at the Winter Paralympics.

Participating nations
Key

See also

Ice hockey at the Olympic Games
Ice sledge hockey

Notes

References

 

 
Sports at the Winter Paralympics
Paralympics
Paralympics